Palaeogeography, Palaeoclimatology, Palaeoecology ("Palaeo3") is a peer-reviewed scientific journal publishing multidisciplinary studies and comprehensive reviews in the field of palaeoenvironmental geology. The journal is edited by Howard Falcon-Lang, Shuzhong Shen, Alex Dickson, Mary Elliot, Meixun Zhao, Lucia Angiolini. It was established in 1965 and is currently published by Elsevier.

Indexing and abstracting
Palaeogeography, Palaeoclimatology, Palaeoecology is indexed and abstracted in the following databases:

According to the Journal Citation Reports, Advance in Space Research has a 2020 impact factor of 3.318.

References

External links 
 

Biology journals
Elsevier academic journals
English-language journals
Publications established in 1965
Weekly journals
Paleoclimatology
Climatology journals
Paleontology journals